Stanley John Fairbairn (14 July 1886 – 26 February 1943) was an Australian rules footballer who played with Melbourne in the Victorian Football League (VFL).

Notes

External links 

 

1886 births
1943 deaths
Australian rules footballers from Victoria (Australia)
Melbourne Football Club players
South Ballarat Football Club players